Carl "Cork" Civella (January 28, 1910 – October 2, 1994) was the leader of the Kansas City crime family following the death of his brother, long-time crime boss Nicholas Civella, after heading day-to-day operations during the mid-1970s. 

Carl's reign as Kansas city boss was brief. In 1984, he and his son, Anthony Civella, were convicted of skimming operations in Las Vegas casinos throughout the 1970s. Carl was sentenced to 10-to-20 years in prison, with another 10 years added on an unrelated charge.

On October 2, 1994, Carl Civella died in prison of pneumonia.

External links
The American "Mafia": Who was who ? - Carl Civella

1910 births
1994 deaths
American gangsters of Italian descent
Kansas City crime family
American crime bosses
Deaths from pneumonia in the United States
American people who died in prison custody
Prisoners who died in United States federal government detention